Sagar is a surname and given name of multiple origins.

In Sanskrit, sāgara means Sea. In India, Sagar is a very common name and surname.

Origins

Anglo-Saxon
Sagar is a patronymic Old English name. Most, if not all, people of the Anglo-Saxon period of England with this surname descend from a man (or even a number of men) known as Sagar.  The name most likely derives from the diphthongal Old English word ‘Sægar’, meaning ‘sea-spear’.  Presumably it denotes a maritime warrior of the type that either commenced invasions of Britain in the fifth century or were invited as mercenaries in the political and military vacuum created with the final departure of Roman troops.  Spelling variations include: Sager, Seegar, Seager, Sigar, Segar, Seger, Saker, Sakar, and many more.

In Anglo-Saxon England, the name was found in several areas, but predominantly in the northern areas of England (Yorkshire and Lancashire) which were part of the Angle Kingdom of Northumbria.  (The Angles largely settled in the areas known as East Anglia, Mercia and Northumbria in the fifth century.  The Angles were the dominant Germanic tribe in the Anglo-Saxon settlement of Britain, and gave their name to the English.  Originally from Angeln in Schleswig-Holstein, a list of their kings has been preserved in the Anglo-Saxon Chronicle and other sources).

The Domesday Book records a man named Sagar as a Saxon landowner in Devon in 1086.  It also records a man called Segarus, no less a Latinised version of the name, holding land in Essex at around the same time.  By far the largest concentration of the surname Sagar however is found within a 50 km radius in the Lancashire/Yorkshire border area.  Old church birth records show relatively moderate numbers of persons with the surname Sagar being born in towns such as Bradford, Halifax, and Askrigg in West Yorkshire.

From the 17th century onwards, records show persons with the surname Sagar or similar migrating from Britain or Europe to various parts of the world including North America, Australia, New Zealand, South Africa, Kenya, and Rhodesia (Zimbabwe).

India
Sagar in Hindi and Marathi means ocean. Sagar is a very common first name in India for boys and also a surname (last name) used by various communities.

Persian
The name ساغر (saaGar) meaning cup, goblet, wine (as used in poetry in Hindi/Urdu) bowl is used by Persian and Urdu speaking people in Iran, Afghanistan, Pakistan, etc.

List of people
Notable people with the name include:

Surname
 Amrit Sagar (1975) Indian film director
 Anthony Sagar (1920–1973), English actor
 Arun Sagar (born 1965), Indian film actor, art director, and comedian
 Chameli Bai Sagar (elected 1957), Indian politician 
 Charlie Sagar (1878–1919), English footballer
 Faridur Reza Sagar 1955 Ganpat Khasra Khatauni Tahsil rahali Jila Sagar gram Mein nai Gaon bhavpura )
 Geet Sagar (born 1984), Indian X-factor winner
 Ian Sagar (born 1982), British wheelchair basketball player
 John Warburton Sagar (1878-1941), English rugby union player and diplomat
 Kamal Sagar (born 1969), Indian architect, designer, and real estate developer
 Kripa Sagar (1875-1939), Punjabi poet
 Mamta Sagar, Indian writer
 Mohammed Sagar (born 1976), Iraqi refugee
 Nethi Vidya Sagar (elected 2007), Indian politician
 Nishanth Sagar (born 1980), Indian actor
 Pearl Sagar (born 1958), Northern Irish politician
 Preeti Sagar, Bollywood playback singer
 Pushpa Ratna Sagar (1922-2011), Nepalese lexicographer
 Ramanand Sagar (1917–2005), Indian film director
 Samta Sagar, Indian actress
 Shalini Kapoor Sagar (born 1976), Indian actress
 Siddharth Sagar, Indian stand-up comedian and television act
 Vivek Sagar, Indian music composer
 Ted Sagar (1910–1986), English footballer
 Yasho Sagar (died 2012), Indian actor 
 Yogesh Sagar, Indian politician

Given name
 Sagar Ballary (born 1975), Indian film director
 Sagar Mangalorkar (born 1990), Indian cricketer
 Sagar Mishra (born 1993), Indian cricketer
Sagar (actor) (born 1983), Indian actor, full name Sagar Mulukuntla
 Sagar Mitchell (1866–1952), English pioneer of cinematography
 Sagar Pun (born 1993), Nepalese cricketer
 Sagar Sen (1932–1983) was a Bengali singer
Sagar Shah (born 1990), Indian chess player
 Sagar Thapa (born 1984), Nepalese footballer
 Sagar Trivedi (born 1991), Indian cricketer

References

 The Internet Surname Database: http://www.surnamedb.com/surname.aspx?name=Sagar
 House of Names: http://www.houseofnames.com/xq/asp.fc/qx/sagar-family-crest.htm

Hindu surnames
Surnames of Old English origin